2010 Visa-Bikar was the 51st season of the Icelandic national football cup. It began on 7 May 2010 and ended with the final on 14 August 2010 at Laugardalsvöllur. The winners qualified for the second qualifying round of the 2011–12 UEFA Europa League.

First round
The First Round consisted of 38 teams from the lower Icelandic divisions and eight teams from the third division. The matches were played between 7 and 9 May 2010.

|colspan="3" style="background-color:#97DEFF"|6 May 2010

|-
|colspan="3" style="background-color:#97DEFF"|7 May 2010

|-
|colspan="3" style="background-color:#97DEFF"|8 May 2010

|-
|colspan="3" style="background-color:#97DEFF"|9 May 2010

|-
|colspan="3" style="background-color:#97DEFF"|10 May 2010

|-
|colspan="3" style="background-color:#97DEFF"|13 May 2010

|}

Second round
The Second Round included the 23 winners from the previous round as well as one team from the lower Icelandic divisions (Höfrungur), four teams from the third division and all 12 teams from the second division. The matches were played between 17 and 19 May 2010.

|colspan="3" style="background-color:#97DEFF"|17 May 2010

|-
|colspan="3" style="background-color:#97DEFF"|18 May 2010

|-
|colspan="3" style="background-color:#97DEFF"|19 May 2010

|}

Third round
The Third round included the 20 winners from the previous round and the 12 teams from the Úrvalsdeild. These matches were played on 2 and 3 June 2010. The round saw the demise of the reigning champions Breiðablik come to an end at the hands of FH and a penalty shoot out which saw Breiðablik miss 3 penalty kicks in a row. The round also saw the progression of two 2. deild karla teams to the fourth round, BÍ/Bolungarvík and Vikingur Ó.

Fourth round
This round consisted of the 16 winners of the previous round. These matches were drawn on 7 June at the Football Association of Iceland headquarters in Reykjavík. The draw consisted of 8 teams from the Pepsi-deild karla, 6 from the 1. deild karla and 2 from the 2. deild karla. All matches were played between 23 and 24 June 2010.

Quarter-finals
This round consisted of the 8 winners of the previous round. These matches were drawn on 25 June at the Football Association of Iceland headquarters in Reykjavík. The draw consisted of five teams from the Pepsi-deild karla, two from the 1. deild karla and one from the 2. deild karla. All matches were played between 1 and 12 July 2010.

Semi-finals
The semi-final matches involve the four winners from the previous quarter-final round on 28 and 29 July 2010. The draw took place at the Football Association of Iceland headquarters in Reykjavík on 13 July 2010.

Final
The final took place at Laugardalsvöllur on 14 August 2010 and was contested between the winners of the previous semi-final matches.

External links
 Official site 

2010 in Icelandic football
2010 domestic association football cups
2010